Dynamite Monster Boogie Concert is a studio album by American hard rock band Raging Slab, released in 1993. It was released digitally in 2009.

The video for "Anywhere But Here" included a cameo by actor Gary Coleman.

Production
The album was recorded on a Pennsylvania farm, in a studio constructed by the band. It was produced by Brendan O'Brien; the track "Lynne" features strings provided by Led Zeppelin's John Paul Jones.

Raging Slab had recorded three full albums between its 1989 debut and Dynamite Monster Boogie Concert, but due to record label issues did not release any of them.

Reception
In 2005, Dynamite Monster Boogie Concert was ranked number 395 in Rock Hard magazine's book The 500 Greatest Rock & Metal Albums of All Time. The Chicago Reader called the album "rife with fragments of the 70s: Lynyrd Skynyrd's southern blues boogie, Blue Oyster Cult's heavy rock hooks, Grand Funk Railroad's braggadocio, ZZ Top's riff-drenched electric blues, Bad Company's pure hard rock." Entertainment Weekly wrote that "the absurdly rocking, two-guitars-plus-slide Slab combines about 85 genres into one stinking heap of divine something-or-other." The Washington Post wrote that "the Slab is a retro-boogie band, enlivened by [Greg] Strzempka's skill with melody and arrangement but utterly predictable in style." Spin praised the album's devotion to funk, writing that "the band harks back to an age when heavy rock had more in common with black proto-funk such as the Meters than with the rhythmic regimentation of today's metal."

Track listing
All songs written by Greg Strzempka.

Personnel

Band members
Greg Strzempka - vocals, guitar, slide, banjo, mandolin
Elyse Steinman - slide guitar, vocals, lap steel
Alec Morton - four stringed electric bass
Mark Middleton - lead guitar, slide, vocals
Paul Sheehan - drums, cymbals

Additional personnel
Danny Frankel - smaller drums
John Paul Jones - strings on "Lynne"

Credits
Produced and mixed by Brendan O'Brien
Engineered by Nick DiDia
Recorded at Big Mo Recording while it was parked at the Slab Farm
Executive Producer: Rick Rubin
Album Art by Raging Slab
Band photos by Allison Dyer
Other photos by The Electric Mystress

References

1993 albums
Albums produced by Rick Rubin
Raging Slab albums
American Recordings (record label) albums